Daniel Everette Hale (born 1987/1988) is an American whistleblower and former National Security Agency (NSA) intelligence analyst who sent classified information about drone warfare to the press. Hale served in the United States Air Force 2009–2013 before joining the National Security Agency and leaking classified documents to The Intercept. In 2021, he pled guilty to retaining and transmitting national defense information and was sentenced to 45 months in prison. As of October 2021, he was incarcerated at United States Penitentiary, Marion, Illinois, with a scheduled release date of July 5, 2024.

Government service 

Hale served in the United States Air Force from July 2009 to July 2013. He was an enlisted airman. In 2013, he was assigned to the NSA and the Joint Special Operations Command at Bagram Airfield, the largest U.S. military base in Afghanistan, where he helped identify targets for assassination. In February 2014, after leaving the Air Force and becoming a contractor at the National Geospatial-Intelligence Agency, Hale leaked 17 classified documents to The Intercept. The documents contained details about U.S. kill lists and civilian casualties of drone strikes, and in some cases revealed actions that, if proven, would amount to war crimes. The documents formed the basis of a series of articles, the "Drone Papers", published by The Intercept in October 2015.

Marjorie Cohn writing for Truthout reported that, "During one five-month period during January 2012 to February 2013, nearly 90 percent of those killed by drone strikes were not the intended target ... But civilian bystanders were nonetheless classified as 'enemies killed in action' unless proven otherwise."

Government investigation and prosecution 

On August 8, 2014, the FBI raided his home in Lorton, Virginia, in what he described as retribution for his political activism. In 2016, he appeared in the documentary film National Bird, where he described his crisis of conscience and the FBI raid.

In 2019, Hale was charged with disclosing intelligence information and theft of government property. He was arraigned in the U.S. District Court for the Eastern District of Virginia. In March 2021, he pleaded guilty to retaining and transmitting national defense information. On July 27, 2021, citing the need to deter others from disclosing government secrets, U.S. District Judge Liam O'Grady sentenced Hale to 45 months in prison for violating the Espionage Act of 1917. "You are not being prosecuted for speaking out about the drone program killing innocent people", O'Grady told Hale. "You could have been a whistleblower ... without taking any of these documents." In court, Hale said he accepted punishment for taking the documents, and for taking innocent lives during his participation in the drone program. Noting that he is a descendant of Nathan Hale, executed for spying on the British for the Continental Army during the American Revolutionary War, Hale paraphrased his ancestor's reported last words, saying, "I have but this one life to give in service of my country."

Incarceration 

Following sentencing, Hale was transferred from Alexandria City Jail to temporary confinement at Northern Neck Regional Jail in Virginia to await further disposition. In early October 2021, Hale was transferred to a communications management unit in the United States Penitentiary, Marion, Illinois.

In August 2021 he received the Sam Adams Award for Integrity in Intelligence, eponymously named for a Vietnam War-era whistleblower, for "performing a vital public service at great personal cost—imprisonment for truth-telling". Later that month, U.S. Representative Ilhan Omar (D-MN) wrote to President Biden requesting a full pardon or commutation of sentence for Hale.

Publications

References

External links 

1980s births
Living people
Place of birth missing (living people)
Year of birth uncertain
United States Army personnel of the War in Afghanistan (2001–2021)
American whistleblowers
National Geospatial-Intelligence Agency people
National Security Agency people
Prisoners and detainees of Tennessee
United States Air Force airmen